Steven Lloyd Salzberg (born 1960) is an American computational biologist and computer scientist who is a Bloomberg Distinguished Professor of Biomedical Engineering, Computer Science, and Biostatistics at Johns Hopkins University, where he is also Director of the Center for Computational Biology.

Early life and education 
Salzberg was born in 1960 as one of four children to Herman Salzberg, a Distinguished Professor Emeritus of Psychology, and Adele Salzberg, a retired school teacher. Salzberg did his undergraduate studies at Yale University where he received his Bachelor of Arts degree in English in 1980. In 1981 he returned to Yale, and he received his Master of Science and Master of Philosophy degrees in Computer Science in 1982 and 1984, respectively. After several years in a startup company, he enrolled at Harvard University, where he earned a Ph.D. in Computer Science in 1989.

Career
After earning his Ph.D., Salzberg joined Johns Hopkins University as an Assistant Professor in the Department of Computer Science, and was promoted to Associate Professor in 1997. From 1998–2005, he was the head of the Bioinformatics department at The Institute for Genomic Research, one of the world's largest genome sequencing centers. Salzberg then joined the Department of Computer Science at the University of Maryland, College Park, where he was the Horvitz Professor of Computer Science as well as the Director of the Center for Bioinformatics and Computational Biology. In 2011, Salzberg returned to Johns Hopkins University as a Professor in the Department of Medicine. From 2014, he was a Professor in the Department of Biomedical Engineering in the School of Medicine; the Department of Computer Science in the Whiting School of Engineering; and in the Department of Biostatistics in the Bloomberg School of Public Health.

In 2013, Salzberg won the Benjamin Franklin award in bioinformatics.

In March 2015, he was named a Bloomberg Distinguished Professor at Johns Hopkins University for his accomplishments as an interdisciplinary researcher and excellence in teaching the next generation of scholars. The Bloomberg Distinguished Professorships were established in 2013 by a gift from Michael Bloomberg. Salzberg holds joint appointments in the Johns Hopkins Whiting School of Engineering, Johns Hopkins School of Medicine, and the Johns Hopkins Bloomberg School of Public Health.

Research 
Salzberg has been a prominent scientist in the field of bioinformatics and computational biology since the 1990s. He has made many contributions to gene finding algorithms, notably the GLIMMER program for bacterial gene finding as well as several related programs for finding genes in animals, plants, and other organisms. He has also been a leader in genome assembly research and is one of the initiators of the open source AMOS project. He was a participant in the human genome project as well as many other genome projects, including the malaria genome (Plasmodium falciparum) and the genome of the model plant Arabidopsis thaliana. In 2001–2002, he and his colleagues sequenced the anthrax that was used in the 2001 anthrax attacks. They published their results in the journal Science in 2002. These findings helped the FBI track the source of the attacks to a single vial at Ft. Detrick in Frederick, Maryland.

Salzberg together with David Lipman and Lone Simonsen started the Influenza Genome Sequencing Project in 2003, a project to sequence and make available the genomes of thousands of influenza virus isolates.

Soon after the advent of next-generation sequencing (NGS) in the mid-2000s, Salzberg's research lab and his collaborators developed a suite of highly efficient, accurate programs for alignment of NGS sequences to large genomes and for assembly of sequences from RNA-Seq experiments. These include the "Tuxedo" suite, comprising the Bowtie, TopHat, and Cufflinks programs, which have been cited tens of thousands of times in the years since their publication.

Salzberg has also been a vocal advocate against pseudoscience and in favor of the teaching of evolution in schools, and has authored editorials and appeared in print media on this topic.  He writes a widely read column at Forbes magazine on science, medicine, and pseudoscience. His work at Forbes won the 2012 Robert P. Balles Prize in Critical Thinking.

Salzberg was a charter member of the Cambridge Working Group in 2014, which was created to express alarm in the scientific community over the creation of highly transmissible and contagious viruses (also called Gain-of-function research) and the likelihood of an accidental lab release.

Publications 
Salzberg has authored or co-authored over 300 scientific publications. He has more than 290,000 citations in Google Scholar and an h-index of 156. In 2014, 2015, 2016, and 2017, Salzberg was selected for inclusion in HighlyCited.com, a ranking compiled by the Institute for Scientific Information of scientists who are among the top 1% most cited for their subject field during the previous ten years. He was also chosen for this list when it was first created in 2001. This list of highly cited researchers continues under Clarivate, and Salzberg was also included in the list in 2018, 2019, 2020, 2021, and 2022.

Highly cited articles (more than 10,000 citations) 

 2012 with B Langmead, Fast gapped-read alignment with Bowtie 2, in: Nature Methods. Vol. 9, nº 4; 357.
 2009 With B Langmead, C Trapnell, M Pop, Ultrafast and memory-efficient alignment of short DNA sequences to the human genome, in: Genome Biology. Vol. 10, nº 3; 1-10.
 2001 with JC Venter, MD Adams, EW Myers, PW Li, RJ Mural, et al, The sequence of the human genome, in: Science. Vol. 291, nº 5507; 1304-1351.
 2010 with C Trapnell, BA Williams, G Pertea, A Mortazavi, G Kwan, MJ Van Baren, BJ Wold, L Pachter, Transcript assembly and quantification by RNA-Seq reveals unannotated transcripts and isoform switching during cell differentiation, in: Nature Biotechnology. Vol. 28, nº 5; 511-515.
 2009 with C Trapnell, L Pachter, TopHat: discovering splice junctions with RNA-Seq, in: Bioinformatics. Vol. 25, nº 9; 1105-1111.
 2013 with D Kim, G Pertea, C Trapnell, H Pimentel, R Kelley, TopHat2: accurate alignment of transcriptomes in the presence of insertions, deletions and gene fusions, in: Genome Biology. Vol. 14, nº 4; 1-13.
 2015 with D Kim, B Langmead, HISAT: a fast spliced aligner with low memory requirements, in: Nature Methods Vol. 12, 357–360. (2015)

Awards 

 2020 Accomplishments by a Senior Scientist Award, International Society for Computational Biology
 2014-2020 Named Highly Cited Researcher, Thomson Reuters/Clarivate
 2018 Elected member of the American Academy of Arts and Sciences
 2013 Named Fellow, International Society for Computational Biology
 2013 Robert G. Balles Prize in Critical Thinking
 2009 Genome Biology Award
 2007 Hot 100 Authors, BioMed Central
 2004 Fellow, American Association for the Advancement of Science
 1996 NIH Career Award

References

External links 
 genome.fieldofscience.com Salzberg's science blog
 Salzberg's column at Forbes magazine
 cs.duke.edu Duke Computer Science Colloquia Steven Salzberg - includes biography
 Open source software from the Salzberg lab and other groups in the Hopkins Center for Computational Biology

Living people
Yale University alumni
Harvard School of Engineering and Applied Sciences alumni
Johns Hopkins Biomedical Engineering faculty
University of Maryland, College Park faculty
21st-century American biologists
American bioinformaticians
Influenza researchers
Jewish scientists
1960 births
Fellows of the American Association for the Advancement of Science
Fellows of the International Society for Computational Biology